The Freinet classification ("To organise everything") is used in the libraries of some elementary schools, and was invented by Célestin Freinet to facilitate the easy finding of documents, and the use of the "Bibliothèque de Travail".

The principles are simple: Everything is split into 12 major divisions. 12 subdivisions along the principles of the Dewey Decimal system are then divided into 10, and then 10 again.

Because of its logical classifications based on school work, this classification is seen by some educators  to be more natural and more logical to students than official classifications based on organizational criteria. The last revision took place in 1984. It is still used, in addition to keywords, in IT and some data information organization systems.

The 12 divisions

0. Reference
 00 General
 01 English Dictionaries
 02 Dictionaries in foreign languages
 03 Bilingual, trilingual, ... dictionaries
 04 Other Dictionaries (proper names, places, ...)
 05 Encyclopedias
 06 Repertory, bibliographies
 07 Reference works (textbooks)

1. Natural Environment
 11 Land (geology)
 12 Relief
 13 Freshwater
 14 The oceans and seas
 15 The climates and vegetation
 16 Heaven (astronomy)
 17 Nature and Life (ecology)

2. Plants
 21 Study of the plant
 22 The flowering plants
 23 The plants without flowers or seeds
 24 The microscopic beings

3. Animals
 30 General study of the body (in humans and animals)
 31 The health of humans
 32 Mammals (except humans)
 33 Birds
 34 Reptiles and amphibians
 35 Fish
 36 Insects (articulated)
 37 Other articulated
 38 Shellfish
 39 Other animals

4. Other sciences
 41 Mathematics
 42 Physical Sciences
 43 Chemistry
 44 Technology

5. Food and Agriculture
 51 Working the earth
 52 Cultures
 53 Livestock
 54 Forestry
 55 Fishing
 56 Hunting
 57 Food industry
 58 Foods
 59 Drinks

6. Labor and Industry
 60 General
 61 Sources of energy and engines
 62 Mining and quarrying
 63 Metals
 64 Chemical Industry
 65 Textile and clothing industry
 66 Building industry, housing and furniture
 67 Other Industries

7. The city and stock exchanges
 71 The city, the municipality
 72 Trade
 73 Road Transport
 74 Rail transport
 75 Inland waterway transport
 76 Maritime Transport
 77 Air transportation and space
 78 Post, Telecommunications and IT
 79 Travel and Tourism

8. Society
 81 People
 82 Contracts (environmental and social issues)
 83 Administrative organization of society
 84 Organisation of social policy
 85 Reports from nations

9. Culture and Recreation
 91 Education and instructions
 92 Languages
 93 Literature and Philosophy
 94 Religions
 95 Arts & Entertainment
 96 Sports and Games

G. Geography
 G0 The study of geography
 G1 General Geography
 G2 Geography locally and regionally
 G3 Our country
 G4 Europe
 G5 Asia
 G6 Africa
 G7 America
 G8 Oceania
 G9 The Polar World

H. History
 H1 Prehistory
 H2 The East, Greece
 H3 Rome and the early Middle Ages (from −700 to 987)
 H4 Middle Ages (from 987 to 1492)
 H5 Absolute monarchy (1492 to 1789)
 H6 Struggles for Democracy (1789 to 1848)
 H7 Organization of the Republic (1848 to 1914)
 H8 Contemporary history (1914–present)

References

External links
Internet links based on the Freinet classification from l'École des Bruyères at Louvain-la-Neuve, Belgium
Organising everything at the website of l'École Bizu, France

Library cataloging and classification